North East Centre for Technology Application and Reach (NECTAR) is an autonomous society within the Indian Government. It operates under the Department of Science & Technology. Its headquarters are in Shillong, Meghalaya. The center work towards the social and economic development of the Northeastern region by harnessing and leveraging frontier technologies available through the central scientific departments and institutions. To assist the region, NECTAR uses technology to address biodiversity concerns, watershed management, telemedicine, horticulture, infrastructure planning and development, planning and monitoring, and tele-schooling using cutting-edge MESHNET solutions, employment generation, etc. through the utilization of local products/resources and associated skill development.

NECTAR partners with the following Indian states: Arunachal Pradesh, Assam, Manipur, Meghalaya, Mizoram, Nagaland, Sikkim, and Tripura.

History  
NECTAR was formed in 2012 through the merger of the former National Mission on Bamboo Applications (NMBA) and the Mission on Geospatial Applications (MGA).

Mission 
NECTAR's primary mandate is to design technological solutions and to adapt and adopt such technologies for effective, local use in Northeast India in consultation with state governments. Mission statement:

Key areas 
 Agro & Food Processing 
 Renewable energy  
 Bamboo Applications
 Geo Spatial Applications
 Employment & Livelihood Generation
 Communication

Key Projects 

 Saffron cultivation in the North Eastern region
 Bamboo applications and product development
 Urban Management and Urban Civic Services
Remote sensing and aerial mapping 
 Training and skills development programs in rural areas
 Development of SDR (Software Defined Radios)
 High Speed Wireless Mesh Networks for Telemedicine & CCTV based monitoring
 Technology Support for Agriculture Crop Analysis
Various other research & development programs

References 

Ministry of Science and Technology (India)
Science and technology in India
Science and technology ministries
2012 establishments in Meghalaya
Scientific organizations established in 2012